Brown Glacier is a large glacier on the west side of Latady Mountains, flowing south-southeast to join Ketchum Glacier, west of Gardner Inlet, on Lassiter Coast, Palmer Land. Mapped by the United States Geological Survey (USGS) from surveys and U.S. Navy aerial photographs, 1961–67. Named after Lawrence Edward Brown, a geologist who was a member of the USGS field party which crossed this glacier, 1969–70.

References

Glaciers of Palmer Land